The mannerist architecture and sculpture in Poland includes two major traditions, Polish/Italian and Dutch/Flemish, that dominated in northern Poland. The Silesian mannerism of southwestern Poland was largely influenced by Bohemian and German mannerism, while the Pomeranian mannerism of northwestern Poland was influenced by Gothic tradition and Northern German mannerism. The Jews in Poland adapted patterns of Italian and Polish mannerism to their own tradition. The mannerist complex of Kalwaria Zebrzydowska and mannerist City of Zamość are UNESCO World Heritage Sites.

The Polish mannerism, though largely dominated by Italian architects and sculptors, has unique characteristics which differentiate it from its Italian equivalent, including attics, decorational motives, the construction and shape of buildings, and Dutch, Bohemian, and German influences. Among the notable architects and sculptors of Polish/Italian mannerism were Santi Gucci, Jan Michałowicz of Urzędów, Giovanni Maria Padovano, Giovanni Battista di Quadro, Jan Frankiewicz, Galleazzo Appiani, Jan Jaroszewicz, Bernardo Morando, Kasper Fodyga, Krzysztof Bonadura, Antoneo de Galia, and many others.

Lesser Poland Voivodeship

Lower Silesian Voivodeship

Opole Voivodeship

Silesian Voivodeship

Subcarpathian Voivodeship

Świętokrzyskie Voivodeship

See also
List of mannerist structures in Central Poland
List of mannerist structures in Northern Poland

Notes and references

Mannerist architecture in Poland